State Highway 231 (SH 231) is a state highway in Pueblo County, Colorado, United States. SH 231's southern terminus is at U.S. Route 50 Business (US 50 Bus.) in Vineland, and the northern terminus is at U.S. Route 50 (US 50) and SH 96 in Devine.

Route description
SH 231 runs , starting at a junction with  US 50 Bus., heading north across the Arkansas River and ending at a junction with US 50 / SH 96.

Major intersections

See also

 List of state highways in Colorado

References

External links

231
Transportation in Pueblo County, Colorado